Nurhayat Hiçyakmazer (born 4 October 1983), nicknamed "Prenses Zeyna" (Turkish for "Xena the Warrior Princess"), is a Turkish female martial artist competing in the boxing, Muay Thai and wushu disciplines. She is a member of the Star Academy Sport Club in Adana, where she is coached by Hakan Şahade.

Early life
She was born on 4 October 1983 in Adana as the second child of four siblings. Inspired by her boxer uncles, Nurhayat Hiçyakmazer began in 1995 with training in boxing. After fighting in amateur boxing some years, she got interested in wushu. In 2004, she began Muay Thai performing.

After the high school, she attended the Gazi University in Ankara, and gained in 2002 a degree in Sports and Physical Education. After some years of unemployment, she became a secondary education school teacher in Istanbul.

Asked about her nickname, she comments: There is a saying that "a good wrestler keeps his ear intact, and a good boxer his nose". I could keep my face undemolished sofar. At a tournament in Hungary, my Russian opponents named me "Xena the Warrior Princess". My husband calls me now also "Xena".

Family
On 16 September 2010 Nurhayat Hiçyakmazer married K-1 fighter Erhan "Pitbull Attack" Deniz, a Turkish kickboxing champion and her former trainer.

Achievements
Muay Thai
 (67 kg) 2007 European Championships - October 7–14, 2007, Vigo, Spain
 (67 kg) 2010 National Championships - April 13–17, 2010, Bodrum, Turkey
 (67 kg) 2010 European Championships - May 25–30, 2010, Rome, Italy
 (67 kg) 2010 World Championships - November 27-December 5, 2010, Bangkok, Thailand

Wushu
 (65 kg) 4th World Cup - November 11–17, 2007, Beijing, China
 (65 kg) 9th World Wushu Championships - November 11–17, 2007, Beijing, China

References

1983 births
Living people
Sportspeople from Adana
Gazi University alumni
Turkish schoolteachers
Turkish women boxers
Turkish Muay Thai practitioners
Turkish sanshou practitioners
European champions for Turkey
Female Muay Thai practitioners
20th-century Turkish sportswomen
21st-century Turkish sportswomen